The Slieve Bloom Mountains is a mountain range in Ireland. While not very high, they are extensive by local standards. The highest points are Arderin at the southwestern end of the range and Baunreaghcong at the end of the Ridge of Capard.

The Slieve Bloom Mountains stretch from near Roscrea in the south west to Rosenallis in the north-west, forming a link between County Laois and County Offaly. 
Looped walking trails have been developed at six trailheads in the Slieve Blooms, Glenbarrow, Clonaslee, Cadamstown, Kinnitty, Glenafelly Forest Car Park and Glen Monicknew. Walking trails are colour-coded by difficulty. The  Slieve Bloom Way can be accessed from any of these trailheads. The Silver River Eco Trail is near Cadamstown.

Glenbarrow Falls are located a few miles from Rosenallis. Some walking trails go to the falls and up to the Ridge of Capard. There is a significant population of red grouse in the hills.

There are also mountain biking trails in the Slieve Blooms. The trails can be accessed from two trailheads, one at Kinnitty Village and the second at Baunreagh near Mountrath.

On a clear day, one can see the high points of the four ancient provinces of Ireland.

Toponymy
According to the Bodleian Dinnshenchas, here are two theories of how the mountains were given their name:

[11. SLIAB BLADMA.] Bladma or Blod, son of Cú, son of Cass Clothmín, killed the cowherd of Bregmael, the smith of Cuirche, son of Snithe, King of Húi Fuatta. Then he went in his little boat till he set up at Ross Bladma — Ross n-Áir, “Wood of Slaughter,” was its name at first. Thence he went to the mountain. Hence is “Sliab Bladma” (Bladma’s Mountain). Whence the poet said: ‘Blod, son of Cú, son of Cass Clothmín, Killed the cowherd of fair Bregmael, The smith of Cuirche Mór, son of Snithe: He set up at Ross Tíre ind Áir.’ Or it is Blod, son of Breogan, that died there; and from him the mountain of Bladma was named.

Edward J. Gwynn’s The Metrical Dindshenchas give a longer account and another origin story (bleda mara "sea-monsters" cf. Modern Irish bleidhmhíol "monster; whale"):

Sliab Bladma
Blod, son of Cu, son of Cass the renowned, son of Uachall the many-shaped, killed Bregmael the famous smith of Cuirche, son of Snithe the swimmer.
Curche Cendmar was a daring king over Medraige and over Herot; through him Blod, son of Cass Clothmin, found never sure protection. He fared in his ship–clear purpose from the Bottom of pure-cold Galway, from Ath Cliath in wide Herot to Ath Cliath in Cualu. Thence he came after many a turn to the Point of Nar, son of Edliuc, and possessed, as his special portion, the mountain whose name derives from Blod. A valiant man who used to wage battle died at Sliab Bladma–vast renown even Blad, son of Bregon, with troops of warriors, died of disease in the monster-haunted Sliab Blod.

Or, it is from the son of Bregon the wrathful that it is named Sliab Bladma, with onsets of women their increase is not far from the cattle was the mountain where it happened through strong Blad.

Or the monsters of the sea that was not calm, beasts–ruisenda was their name–came throughout the land of the tribes, so that from them is named Sliab Bled. Blod, son of Cu, son of Cass Clothmin, slew the herd of Bregmael the smith of Curche, son of Snithe, he settled at Ross Tire Nair.

The Modern Irish meaning of bladhm is "flame; flare up", bladhma being the genitive case.

History and mythology
The mountains formed the northern border of the kingdom of Osraige, and later Upper Ossory. Fionn Mac Cumhaill was brought up in Sliabh Bladhma by his aunts, his mother's sisters the poets Bovmall and Lia Luachra, so that he would be safe from Clann Morna, who had killed his father.

Climate

Highest points
The following table lists the 10 highest major mountain peaks of the Slieve Bloom Mountains, all with a topographic elevation of at least .

References

External links
 
 Slieve Bloom Tourism website
 Slieve Blooms Nature Reserve website
 Offaly Tourism website
 Laois Tourism website

Mountains and hills of County Laois
Mountains and hills of County Offaly
Ramsar sites in the Republic of Ireland
FitzPatrick dynasty